The WAGGGS-Arab Region is the divisional office of the World Association of Girl Guides and Girl Scouts, headquartered in Cairo, Egypt. The WAGGGS-Arab Region comprises 17 members of Guiding in Western Asia and North Africa, including Algeria, Bahrain, Egypt, Jordan, Kuwait, Lebanon, Libya, Mauritania, Morocco, Oman, Palestine, Qatar, Saudi Arabia, Sudan, Tunisia, the United Arab Emirates, and Yemen.

This region is the counterpart of the Arab Scout Region of the World Organization of the Scout Movement (WOSM).

See also

 WOSM-Arab Region

External links
https://web.archive.org/web/20070629135343/http://arab.wagggsworld.org/en/home

World Association of Girl Guides and Girl Scouts
Arab League